We Lived Like Kings (We Did Anything We Wanted) is a 2016 best of album by the Australian punk band Frenzal Rhomb. It was announced on 14 July 2016 on their Facebook page, and released on 19 August 2016.

Track listing

Charts

References

2016 albums
Frenzal Rhomb albums